Karen Noelia Vénica (born 25 January 1992) is an Argentine footballer who plays as a midfielder for Club Atlético River Plate. She was a member of the Argentina women's national team.

She appeared at the 2014 Copa América Femenina and the 2015 Pan American Games.

Personal life
Vénica is a supporter of River Plate.

References

1992 births
Living people
People from General Obligado Department
Sportspeople from Santa Fe Province
Argentine women's footballers
Women's association football midfielders
UAI Urquiza (women) players
Argentina women's international footballers
Footballers at the 2015 Pan American Games
Pan American Games competitors for Argentina